FELDA Waha is a settlement town in Kota Tinggi District, Johor, Malaysia.

List of settlements
FELDA Bukit Waha
FELDA Simpang Waha
FELDA Bukit Easter

Federal Land Development Authority settlements
Kota Tinggi District
Towns in Johor